Baniana gobar is a species of moth of the family Erebidae first described by Herbert Druce in 1898. It is found in Mexico.

References

External links
A review of the subfamily Anobinae with the description of a new species of Baniana Walker from North and Central America (Lepidoptera, Erebidae, Anobinae)

Erebidae